Mudkechula is a rural municipality located in Dolpa District of Karnali Province of Nepal.

The rural municipality is divided into total 9 wards and the headquarters of the rural municipality is situated at Narku.

Demographics
At the time of the 2011 Nepal census, 99.6% of the population in Mudkechula Rural Municipality spoke Nepali and 0.4% Sign language as their first language.

In terms of ethnicity/caste, 53.1% were Chhetri, 18.3% Thakuri, 11.2% Kami, 10.3% Sarki, 4.2% Damai/Dholi, 2.3% Magar, 0.3% other Dalit and 0.3% others.

In terms of religion, 99.8% were Hindu and 0.2% Christian.

References

External links
 Official website

Populated places in Dolpa District
Rural municipalities in Karnali Province
Rural municipalities of Nepal established in 2017